Truth or Consequences, N.M. is a 1997 American neo-noir film directed by Kiefer Sutherland starring Sutherland, Vincent Gallo, Mykelti Williamson, Kevin Pollak, Max Perlich, Rod Steiger and Kim Dickens among others. The film's executive producer was Phillip M. Goldfarb.

Plot
Raymond Lembecke (Vincent Gallo) is an ex-con just out of prison after serving time for selling drugs for his boss Eddie Grillo (John C. McGinley). Lembecke was innocent, but took the fall for Grillo. Lembecke thinks Grillo owes him, so when his former boss gets him a measly job in a warehouse, he decides on revenge and plans to steal a million dollars' worth of drugs from him.

Lembecke plans the heist with Marcus Weans (Mykelti Williamson), who unbeknownst to them is an undercover DEA agent, and the disturbed trigger-happy Curtis Freley (Kiefer Sutherland). Lembecke's girlfriend Addy Monroe (Kim Dickens) also comes along. Curtis kills an undercover DEA agent (who's wearing a wire) during the heist.  They decide to skip town and head to Las Vegas to sell the stolen goods; later they hope to make it to Mexico.

As they head out of the city they kidnap a couple who own a recreational vehicle. But soon, hostage Gordon Jacobson (Kevin Pollak) falls under the spell of the Stockholm syndrome and begins to emulate his kidnappers and wants to stay involved in their hunt. In addition to fleeing the police, the group must also now avoid an assassin named Sir (Martin Sheen) who has been dispatched by the mafia, because Eddie Grillo was merely working for the real Mob Boss in Las Vegas, Tony Vago (Rod Steiger) who they have just attempted to sell the drugs to. In effect they were selling Vago's own drugs back to him.

They visit Wayne, (Max Perlich ) a former jail mate of Lambecke, to try to make another connection to sell the drugs in New Mexico. This leads them to the empty home of Lembecke's brother in Truth or Consequences, NM to make the deal, where all forces convene against them.

Cast
 Vincent Gallo as Raymond Lembecke
 Mykelti Williamson as Marcus Weans
 Kiefer Sutherland as Curtis Freley
 Kevin Pollak as Gordon Jacobson
 Kim Dickens as Addy Monroe
 Grace Phillips as Donna Moreland
 James McDaniel as Frank Thompson
 Rick Rossovich as Robert Boylan
 John C. McGinley as Eddie Grillo
 Max Perlich as Wayne
 Rod Steiger as Tony Vago
 Martin Sheen as Sir

Background
According to Paul Fischer, the film had ratings problems due to certain gruesomely violent portions involving Martin Sheen.

Filming locations
The filming Locations include: Heber, Hurricane, Park City, Rockville, Salt Lake City, and Washington, all in Utah; and Las Vegas and Mesquite, both in Nevada.  No filming took place in Truth or Consequences, New Mexico.

Critical reaction
Due to its limited release the film was not widely reviewed. Critic Jeffrey Lyons of WNBC called the film, "[a] gritty, effective crime drama", according to the film's theatrical poster.

Critic Dale Winogura liked the film, especially the first half, and was appreciative of the acting.  He wrote, "Kiefer Sutherland overcomes some of the faults with a sleek stylistic sheen and rapid pacing in the early stages... [and] Gallo turns a typical loser part into a sympathetic antihero, and Dickens supports him with an equally strong and rounded portrayal"

Critic Leslie Rigoulot called the motion picture "a good ride, not a great one," and Ben Hoffman did not like the film because "the actors have to do and say some pretty 
ridiculous things."

The review aggregator Rotten Tomatoes reported that 38% of critics gave the film a positive review, based on 16 reviews.

Distribution
The producers used the following tagline when marketing the film:
When you're running on fear, don't stop for gas.

The film opened in a very limited release on May 2, 1997.

After a few weeks the film went straight to video. Box office sales the first week in circulation were $19,528. Total sales for the run were $109,261 and in its widest release the film appeared in seven theatres.

References

External links
 
 Truth or Consequences, N.M. at Infinite Coolness (wall-papers and screen-captures)

1997 films
1997 crime thriller films
1990s psychological thriller films
American crime thriller films
Films directed by Kiefer Sutherland
Films set in New Mexico
American neo-noir films
TriStar Pictures films
Triumph Films films
Films with screenplays by Brad Mirman
1997 directorial debut films
Films shot in Utah
Films shot in the Las Vegas Valley
Films shot in Nevada
Films shot in Salt Lake City
1990s English-language films
1990s American films